The 1916 West Virginia gubernatorial election took place on November 7, 1916, to elect the governor of West Virginia.

Results

References

1916
gubernatorial
West Virginia
November 1916 events